The Juno Awards of 2003 were presented in Ottawa, Ontario, Canada on 6 April 2003. The primary awards ceremony was hosted that evening by Shania Twain at the Corel Centre (now Canadian Tire Centre) and televised on CTV.

Ceremony highlights 
The evening program included song performances by Avril Lavigne, Our Lady Peace, Sam Roberts, Remy Shand, Swollen Members and host Shania Twain.

Red Rider frontman and long-time solo artist Tom Cochrane was honoured as the 2003 inductee for the Canadian Music Hall of Fame.

During the awards telecast, host Shania Twain made a succession of costume changes with clothing based on logos of every Canadian National Hockey League team. When the time came for her to wear the Toronto Maple Leafs insignia, the crowd in the home arena of the Ottawa Senators provided a substantial booing.

Nominees and winners

People

Artist of the Year 
Winner: Shania Twain

Other nominees:
Daniel Bélanger
Celine Dion
Alanis Morissette
Remy Shand

Group of the Year 
Winner: Sum 41

Other nominees:
Blue Rodeo
Our Lady Peace
Swollen Members
The Tragically Hip

Fan Choice 
Winner: Shania Twain

Other nominees:
Celine Dion
Diana Krall
Avril Lavigne
Nickelback

New Artist of the Year 
Winner:  Avril Lavigne

Other nominees:
Shawn Desman
K-OS
Sam Roberts
Sarah Slean

New Group of the Year 
Winner: Theory of a Deadman

Other nominees:
Bet.e & Stef
Crush
One Ton
Simple Plan

Jack Richardson Producer of the Year 
Winner: Alanis Morissette – "Hands Clean", "So Unsexy" (both songs by Alanis Morissette)

Other nominees:
Garth Richardson – "Family System", "The Red" (both songs by Chevelle)
Arnold Lanni – "I'd Do Anything", "I'm Just A Kid" (both songs by Simple Plan)
Bob Rock – "Somewhere Out There" (Our Lady Peace), "Take Me As I Am" (Tonic)
Remy Shand – "Burning Bridges" "The Way I Feel" (both songs by Remy Shand)

Recording Engineer of the Year 
Winner: Denis Tougas, "Double Agent" and "Everybody's Got A Story" by Amanda Marshall

Other nominees:
Richard Chycki, "Just Like Ali" by Tom Cochrane & Red Rider, "Visions of Paradise" by Mick Jagger
Eric Filto, "Another Miracle" and "Supersexworld" by One Ton
Brad Haehnel, "Shake It Off" by Jarvis Church, "Stoplight" by Scott Merritt
Randy Staub, "Innocent" and "Somewhere Out There" by Our Lady Peace

Songwriter of the Year 
Winner: Chad Kroeger of Nickelback – "Hero",  "How You Remind Me", "Too Bad"

Other nominees:
Avril Lavigne with The Matrix – "Complicated", "I'm with You", "Sk8er Boi"
Ron Sexsmith – "Former Glory", "Gold In Them Hills", "These Days"
Remy Shand – "Burning Bridges", "Take a Message", "The Way I Feel"
Shania Twain with Robert John "Mutt" Lange – "I'm Gonna Getcha (Good)"

Albums

Album of the year 
Winner: Let Go, Avril Lavigne

Other nominees:
Rêver mieux, Daniel Bélanger
A New Day Has Come, Celine Dion
Gravity, Our Lady Peace
Up!, Shania Twain

Aboriginal recording of the Year 
Winner: Lovesick Blues, Derek Miller

Other nominees:
The Right Combination, Vern Cheechoo and Lawrence Martin
spirit world, solid wood, Leela Gilday
Standing Strong, Chester Knight
Round Dance The Night Away, Randy Wood

Alternative album Album of the Year 
Winner: You Forgot It in People, Broken Social Scene

Other nominees:
Square, Buck 65
Make Up The Breakdown, Hot Hot Heat
The New Deal, The New Deal
Alone at the Microphone, Royal City

Blues Album of the Year 
Winner: 6 String Lover, Jack de Keyzer

Other nominees:
First Class Riff-Raff, Fathead
Wise And Otherwise, Harry Manx
Long Hard Road, The Twisters
88th & Jump Street, Kenny "Blues Boss" Wayne

Children's Album of the Year 
Winner: Sing with Fred, Fred Penner

Other nominees:
Nous sommes tous comme les fleurs, Charlotte Diamond
Once Upon A Tune – Volume 3 – Beanstock, Judy & David
Dodo la planète do dream songs night songs, Pelican Music Project
Let's Play, Raffi

Contemporary Christian/Gospel Album of the Year 
Winner: Instrument of Praise, Toronto Mass Choir

Other nominees:
Army Of Love, Jake
Jubilation VIII – A Cappella Plus, Montreal Jubilation Gospel Choir
Saved!, Northern Blues Gospel All Stars
Tumbling After, Starfield

Classical Album of the Year (large ensemble) 
Winner: Bruch Concertos: Vol. II, James Ehnes, Mario Bernardi, Orchestre symphonique de Montreal

Other nominees:
 The Overcoat: Music By Dmitri Shostakovich, Angela Cheng, Mario Bernardi, CBC Radio Orchestra
 Schumann Piano Works, Anton Kuerti, Mario Bernardi, CBC Radio Orchestra
 Nocturnal Dances of Don Juan Quixote, I Musici de Montreal
 A Baroque Feast, Tafelmusik

Classical Album of the Year (solo or chamber ensemble) 
Winner: Liszt: Paganini Studie & Schubert March Transcriptions, Marc-André Hamelin

Other nominees:
Fritz Kreisler, James Ehnes
Ravel: The Complete Solo Piano Music, Angela Hewitt
Graupner – Partitas for Harpsichord, Geneviève Soly
Osvaldo Golijov: Yiddishbuk, St. Lawrence String Quartet

Classical Album of the Year (vocal or choral performance) 
Winner: Mozart Requiem, Les Violons de Roy

Other nominees:
¡Ay Que Si!, Suzie LeBlanc
Margison Sings Verdi, Richard Margison
Of Ladies and Love..., Michael Schade
Bach Cantatas, Daniel Taylor, Theatre of Early Music

Album Design of the Year 
Winner: Exit, K-OS – Marina Dempster, Nelson Garcia, Steve Goode, Margaret Malandruccolo

Other nominees:
Acoustic Kitty, John Mann – John Rummen
Chicken Scratch, Zubot and Dawson – Mark Mushet, John Rummen
Home is Where My Feet Are, Holly McNarland – Garnet Armstrong, Susan Michalek, James Pattyn
Square, Buck 65 – Robbie Cameron, James Patterson

Francophone Album of the Year 
Winner: Rêver mieux, Daniel Bélanger

Other nominees:
Rendez-vous, Sylvain Cossette
Break Syndical, Les Cowboys Fringants
Les Lettres Rouges, Lynda Lemay
De L'amour le mieux, Natasha St-Pier

Instrumental Album of the Year 
Winner: Allegro, Robert Michaels

Other nominees:
Celtic Mystique, Howard Baer
Camino Latino / Latin Journey, Liona Boyd
Lakeside Retreat, Oliver Schroer & Dan Gibson
Big Band Love Songs, The Swingfield Big Band

International Album of the Year 
Winner: The Eminem Show, Eminem

Other nominees:
Weathered, Creed
Escape, Enrique Iglesias
Nellyville, Nelly
Laundry Service, Shakira

Contemporary Jazz Album of the Year 
Winner: Tales from the Blue Lounge, Richard Underhill

Other nominees:
Mistura, Mark Duggan's Vuja dé
Love Songs, Warren Hill
Highwire, Neufeld-Occhipinti Jazz Orchestra
Mother Tree, Jean-Pierre

Vocal Jazz Album of the Year 
Winner: Live in Paris, Diana Krall

Other nominees:
the path of least resistance, Coral Egan
Another Day, Molly Johnson
Pennies From Heaven, Susie Arioli Swing Band
The Wall Street Sessions, Joani Taylor/Bob Murphy

Traditional Jazz Album of the Year 
Winner: Life on Earth, Renee Rosnes

Other nominees:
Spirituals and Dedications, Jane Bunnett, Dewey Redman, Dean Bowman, Larry Cramer, Stanley Cowell, Kieran Overs, Mark McLean
Then and Now, Oliver Jones and Skip Bey
Thank You, Ted, Rob McConnell Tentet
Evolution, Bernard Primeau and the Montreal Jazz Ensemble

Pop Album of the Year 
Winner: Let Go, Avril Lavigne

Other nominees:
Shake It Off, Jarvis Church
Asianblue, Emm Gryner
Everybody's Got a Story, Amanda Marshall
Under Rug Swept, Alanis Morissette

Rock Album of the Year 
Winner: Gravity, Our Lady Peace

Other nominees:
Born a Lion, Danko Jones
The Interzone Mantras, The Tea Party
Detox, Treble Charger
Rained Out Parade, Wide Mouth Mason

Roots and Traditional Album of the Year (Group) 
Winner: Chicken Scratch, Zubot and Dawson

Other nominees:
All Day Every Day, The Bill Hilly Band (The Bills)
Five Dollar Bill, The Corb Lund Band
Your Daughters and Your Sons, The Duhks
Field Guide, John Reischman and the Jaybirds

Roots and Traditional Album of the Year (Solo) 
Winner: Unravel, Lynn Miles

Other nominees:
Gingerbread, Kim Barlow
Voodoo King, Bill Bourne
Failer, Kathleen Edwards
That's How I Walk, Stephen Fearing

World Music Album of the Year 
Winner: Balagane, Jeszcze Raz

Other nominees:
la fiesta mondiale de percussion, The Beat
Cuban Odyssey, Jane Bunnett
Raphael Geronimo's Rumba Calzada Vol. 3, Raphael Geronimo
Hypnotika, Maza Mezé

Releases

Single of the Year 
Winner: "Complicated", Avril Lavigne

Other nominees:
"Bulletproof", Blue Rodeo
"A New Day Has Come", Celine Dion
"Somewhere Out There", Our Lady Peace
"Brother Down", Sam Roberts

Classical Composition of the Year 
Winner: "Requiem for a Charred Skull", Bramwell Tovey, Voices on High

Other nominees:
"Test Run", John Estacio, Banff International String Competition
"Orbiting Garden", Christos Hatzis, Orbiting Garden
"Music for a Thousand Autumns", Alexina Louie, Music for a Thousand Autumns
"Concerto for Cello", Heather Schmidt, Colour Of My Dreams

Country Recording of the Year 
Winner: "I'm Gonna Getcha Good!", Shania Twain

Other nominees:
"I Just Wanna Be Mad", Terri Clark
Curve, Doc Walker
Emerson Drive, Emerson Drive
Shut Up and Kiss Me, Michelle Wright

Dance Recording of the Year 
Winner: Billie Jean, The Sound Bluntz

Other nominees:
Wet, Boomtang
Tribalmania, Grand Menage
Freak The Funk, MC Mario
Sunglasses At Night 2002, Original 3 featuring Corey Hart

R&B/Soul Recording of the Year 
Winner: The Way I Feel, Remy Shand

Other nominees:
You Changed, Jully Black
Get Ready, Shawn Desman
RNB, Carl Henry
World Outside My Window, Glenn Lewis

Rap Recording of the Year 
Winner: Monsters in the Closet, Swollen Members

Other nominees:
El Dorado, BrassMunk
R.A.W., Checkmate
Exit, K-OS
Reloaded, Rascalz

Reggae Recording of the Year 
Winner: You Won't See Me Cry, Sonia Collymore

Other nominees:
Gifted Man, Belinda Brady featuring Carla Marshall
Heartache, Mr. Leroy Brown
You Won't See Me Cry, Sonia Collymore
She Boom, Kulcha Connection
Two Hands Clapping, Snow

Video of the Year 
Winner: "Weapon" by Matthew Good – Director: Ante Kovac, Matthew Good

Other nominees:
"Black Black Heart" by David Usher – producer: Craig Bernard
"Lovercall" by Danko Jones – producer: Craig Bernard, Danko Jones
"Superstarr Pt. 0" by K-OS – producer: Micah Meisner
"PDA" by Interpol – producer: Christopher Mills

External links 
OttawaStart archive of 2003 Juno Awards
Capital Xtra: "Juno mania hits Ottawa"
"The 2003 Juno Awards: The Good, The Bad & The Ugly", April 2003 on TheGATE.ca
 
Juno Awards site

2003
2003 music awards
Music festivals in Ottawa
2003 in Canadian music
April 2003 events in Canada
2003 in Ontario
2000s in Ottawa